Night of Decision is a 1956 West German drama film directed by Falk Harnack and starring Carl Raddatz, Hilde Krahl and Albert Lieven. It was shot at Göttingen Studios and on location in Belgium. The film's sets were designed by the art directors Walter Haag.

Synopsis
After ten years as a prisoner in Siberia, a Belgian industrialist returns home to find that he has been declared dead and his wife has remarried.

Cast
 Carl Raddatz as René Dobersin
 Hilde Krahl as Claire Vernon
 Albert Lieven as Albert Vernon
 Ernst Schröder as Jacques Ardent
 Gisela Tantau as Monique Dobersin
 Harry Meyen as Philip Ardent
 Alfred Schieske as André
 Joseph Offenbach as Smozik
 Hans Hessling as Jules
 Fritz Rémond Jr. as Professor Mareau
 Maria Sebaldt as Penny
 Paul Günther as Matthieu
 Gerd E. Schäfer as Piet van Hoek
 Karl Meixner as Francois
 Rudolf Kalvius as Dr. Fabre
 Alwin Woesthoff as gardener
 Arthur Mentz as head-workman
 Jenny Lattermann as girl
 Benno Hoffmann as guarding soldier

References

Bibliography 
 Bock, Hans-Michael & Bergfelder, Tim. The Concise CineGraph. Encyclopedia of German Cinema. Berghahn Books, 2009.

External links 
 

1956 films
West German films
German drama films
1956 drama films
1950s German-language films
Films directed by Falk Harnack
Films set in Belgium
1950s German films
Films shot at Göttingen Studios
German black-and-white films